Christian Vargas may refer to:

 Christian Vargas (Bolivian footballer) (born 1983), Bolivian football right-back
 Christian Vargas (Colombian footballer) (born 1989), Colombian football goalkeeper